Jefferson and Powell station is a light rail station in the Fisherman's Wharf district of San Francisco, California, serving the San Francisco Municipal Railway's E Embarcadero and F Market & Wharves heritage railway lines. It is located on Jefferson Street at Powell Street. The station opened on March 4, 2000, with the streetcar's extension to Fisherman's Wharf.

The stop is located within walking distance of Pier 41, which has ferry service from Golden Gate Ferry, San Francisco Bay Ferry, as well as services targeted at tourists sightseeing and making trips out to Alcatraz Island. The stop is also served by the route  bus, plus the  bus route, which provides service along the F Market & Wharves and L Taraval lines during the late night hours when trains do not operate.

References

External links 
SFMTA: Jefferson St & Powell St
SFBay Transit (unofficial): Jefferson St & Powell St

Powell
Fisherman's Wharf, San Francisco
Railway stations in the United States opened in 2000